Temburongia is a genus of bamboo from the Sultanate of Brunei on the Island of Borneo. It is usually classified in the subtribe Shibataeinae, though its exact relationship with the subtribe remains unclear.

Species 
The only described species is Temburongia simplex.

References 

Endemic flora of Brunei
Bambusoideae
Bambusoideae genera
Monotypic Poaceae genera